Karatepe-Aslantaş National Park, established in 1958, is a national park in southern Turkey. Situated on the banks of a dam reservoir, it contains an archaeological open-air museum.

Location
Karatepe-Aslantaş National Park is located in the Kadirli and Düziçi districts of Osmaniye Province. The nearest airport is Adana Şakirpaşa Airport at  distance form the national park.

Background
The national park was established on September 28, 1958 as the country's second protected area of this type after the discovery and excavations of important archaeological finds here.

Geography
The national park is located on a slightly rugged terrain between the foothills of Taurus Mountains and the plains of Çukurova, where Ceyhan River runs through. The national park is partly on the banks of a reservoir formed by the Aslantaş Dam. The streams Hillik Creek, Kırağı Creek, Kışla Creek and Kaplan Creek, which are all tributes of the Ceyhan River  and flow into the Aslantaş Dam reservoir, are at the boundaries of the protected area.

Open-air museum

The national park comprises Turkey's first established open-air museum as its centerpiece with the same name. It is situated atop Karatepe, on a peninsula of the Aslantaş Dam reservoir. The site, called locally "Hitit Yarımadası" ("Hittite Peninsula"), is reached by a -long stone-paved trail from the entrance of the national park.

The open-air museum is an archaeological site, an ancient walled settlement of the Neo-Hittites dating back to the 8th century. Excavated between 1946 and 1952, the artifacts, stone statues and reliefs inside the ruined fortification, are left at their original place. Lion statues on stone give the site its name. The Karatepe Bilingual, inscriptions on stone with the same text in Phoenician alphabet and Hieroglyphic Luwian, which enabled the decryption of the Anatolian hieroglyphs, is the most interesting piece of the open-air museum.

Ecosystem
Flora
The national park inhabits many typical flora species of the Mediterranean climate. Turkish pine (Pinus brutia) and oak (Quercus) form woodlands, and (Quercus) shrub groves in the national park. Other plants are turpentine tree (Pistacia terebinthus) and sumac (Rhus). Picnic areas of the national park were planted with umbrella pine (Pinus pinea), walnut tree (Juglans), plane tree (Platanus), mulberry tree (Morus), melissa and hortensia (Hydrangea).

Fauna
15 mammal, 12 reptile, 5 amphibian and 22 fish species are observed in the national park

Recreation
The national park is open to visitors on daily basis. Opportunities offered as recreational outdoor activities are hiking, picnicking and camping.  Camping is permitted at designated picnic locations only. Accommodation is available in Kadirli and Osmaniye.

References

National parks of Turkey
Geography of Osmaniye Province
Landforms of Osmaniye Province
Tourist attractions in Osmaniye Province
Kadirli District
Düziçi District
1958 establishments in Turkey
Protected areas established in 1958